Ghatvog Union is a union parishad in Rupsa Upazila of Khulna District, in Khulna Division, Bangladesh.

Education

Colleges
 Alaipur College (Degree)
 Chandpur College
 Shiyali S.G.C College

Higher secondary schools
 Alaipur United Secondary School, Rupsa, Khulna
 Anandnagar Ideal Secondary School, Rupsa, Khulna
 Goara Hafizur Rahman Secondary School, Rupsa, Khulna
 Shiali Secondary School Shiali, Rupsa, Khulna
 Bamdanga Secondary School, Bamdanga, Rupsa, Khulna
 Doba Bahumukhi Secondary School, Doba, Rupsa, Khulna
 Pithavog D.G.C Secondary School, Pithavog, Rupsa, Khulna
 Narnia Secondary School, Rupsa, Khulna

Madrasas
 Madinatul Ulum Qaomi Madrasa
 Anandanagar Atikmhana Madrasa
 Alaipur Ibtedayi Madrasa
 Alaipur Hafezia Madrasa
 Alaipur Neesariya Sheikhpara Madrasa
 Bamandanga Salafia Madrasa
 Chandpur Dakhil Madsasah

References

Unions of Rupsa Upazila
Populated places in Khulna District